Kłodno  is a village in the administrative district of Gmina Sulęczyno, within Kartuzy County, Pomeranian Voivodeship, in northern Poland.

The village has a population of 80.

External links
For details on the history of the region, see History of Pomerania.

References

Villages in Kartuzy County